David Rice (born c. 1940) is a former American football coach and college athletics administrator.  He served as the head football coach at Western Connecticut State University from 1972 to 1974 and at Fordham University from 1975 to 1978, compiling career college football coaching record of 32–30–2. He led Fordham Rams to the Metropolitan Intercollegiate Conference  (MIC) championship in 1977.  Rice was the athletic director at Fordham  from 1979 to 1985.

Personal life
Rice grew up in Hastings-on-Hudson, New York and attended Hastings High School, graduating in 1957. He went on to play football at Ithaca College from 1957 to 1960, and then earned a master's degree from New York University.

He is married to Jeanne Taylor, the former assistant athletic director at the University of Mississippi. They reside in Marco Island, Florida.

Head coaching record

College

References

Year of birth missing (living people)
Living people
Columbia Lions football coaches
Fordham Rams athletic directors
Fordham Rams football coaches
Ithaca Bombers football players
Western Connecticut State Colonials football coaches
High school football coaches in Connecticut
New York University alumni
People from Hastings-on-Hudson, New York
People from Marco Island, Florida
Sportspeople from Westchester County, New York
Players of American football from New York (state)